Belfast Clifton was a constituency of the Parliament of Northern Ireland.

Boundaries
Belfast Clifton was a borough constituency comprising part of northern Belfast.  It was created in 1929 when the House of Commons (Method of Voting and Redistribution of Seats) Act (Northern Ireland) 1929 introduced first-past-the-post elections throughout Northern Ireland.

Belfast Clifton was created by the division of Belfast North into four new constituencies.  It survived unchanged, returning one member of Parliament, until the Parliament of Northern Ireland was temporarily suspended in 1972, and then formally abolished in 1973.

Politics
In common with other seats in North Belfast, the seat had little nationalist presence.  The seat was usually held by the Ulster Unionist Party, but a variety of independent Unionists contested it and occasionally won, and some labour movement candidates achieved strong results.

Members of Parliament

Election results

At the 1929 and 1933 Northern Ireland general elections, Samuel Hall-Thompson was elected unopposed.

References

Clifton
Northern Ireland Parliament constituencies established in 1929
Northern Ireland Parliament constituencies disestablished in 1973